Maria da Paixão de Jesus da Costa (born April 2, 1960) is a politician and diplomat from East Timor. She is a member of the Partido Social Democrata (PSD) and was vice president of the party.

Biography 
Costa completed a degree in political science. During the United Nations administration of East Timor, she was district administrator for her home district of Aileu.

From 2014, she was East Timor's ambassador to Portugal.

References 

Living people
1960 births
East Timorese politicians
East Timorese women in politics
Ambassadors of East Timor